Estcourt is a town in South Africa.

Estcourt may also refer to:

 Estcourt (surname)
 Estcourt baronets
 Estcourt Station, Maine, northernmost point in New England
 Estcourt, Quebec, village located in the municipality of Pohénégamook
 Estcourt High School, South Africa

See also
Escort (disambiguation)